This is a list of urban plans, which are used by urban planners to direct the future growth of cities.

Historic plans

Australia

Melbourne 

 Melbourne Metropolitan Planning Scheme 1954

Perth 

 Colonial Town Plans of Perth (1829, 1838)
 Plan for the Metropolitan Region, Perth and Fremantle (1955)
 Corridor Plan for Perth (1970)

Sydney 

 County of Cumberland planning scheme (1948)

Canada 

 Greber Plan (1950)

China 

 Greater Shanghai Plan (1929)

France 

 Haussmann's renovation of Paris (1853)
 Plan Voisin (1925)

Germany 

 Hobrecht-Plan (1862)
 Germania (1938)
 Pabst Plan (1940)
 Nordstern (1941)

Netherlands 

 Plan Zuid (1915)

Philippines 

 Frost Plan (1941)

Singapore 

 Jackson Plan (1822)

South Africa 

 Norweto (1986)

Madrid 

 Madrid Metropolitan Plan (1996)

United Kingdom 

 County of London Plan (1943)

 Greater London Plan (1944)

United States 

 L'Enfant Plan (1791)
 Commissioners' Plan of 1811
 Waller Plan (1839)
 McMillan Plan (1902)
 City Plan for Cincinnati (1907)
 Burnham Plan of Chicago (1909)
 Kessler Plan (1910)
 Broadacre City (1935)
 The Baltimore Plan (1949)
 Pei Plan (1965)
 EPCOT (1966)
 PlaNYC (2007)
 Vision 2020: New York City Comprehensive Waterfront Plan (2020)

Current plans

Egypt 

 New Administrative Capital

Ethiopia 

 2014 Addis Ababa Master Plan

Indonesia 

 Nusantara

Pakistan 

 Ravi Riverfront Urban Development Project
 Zulfiqarabad

Saudi Arabia 

 The Line, Saudi Arabia

United Kingdom 

 Big City Plan
 London Plan

City plans
Urban planning